James Weir, known as Jimmy Weir, was a Scottish footballer.

He is known to have played in the Scottish Cup for Dumbarton in 1888 before moving to England to sign for Gateshead, soon switching to Sunderland Albion. He later returned to Scotland with Dunblane.

References

Year of birth missing
1860s births
Year of death missing
Scottish footballers
Dumbarton F.C. players
Sunderland Albion F.C. players
Association football inside forwards